Tilsitt was an 80-gun  ship of the line of the French Navy, designed by Sané.

She defended the harbour on Anvers until 1814.

She was given to Holland with the Treaty of Fontainebleau of 1814, and commissioned in the Dutch Navy as Neptunus.

References
 Jean-Michel Roche, Dictionnaire des Bâtiments de la flotte de guerre française de Colbert à nos jours, tome I

Ships of the line of the French Navy
Ships built in France
Bucentaure-class ships of the line
1810 ships